Bedsit Disco Queen: How I grew up and tried to be a pop star is an autobiography written by Tracey Thorn, first published in February 2013. The book received widespread critical acclaim and was a Sunday Times Top Ten bestseller. The book was featured on BBC Radio 4's Book of the Week in March 2013.

Reception
Writing for The Independent, Fiona Sturges stated that “Thorn is about as far removed from typical notions of a successful singer as it's possible to get. Which makes her ideal to report on the pop star experience, and the ever-shifting landscape of the British music scene of the Eighties and Nineties".

In The Times, Lucy Denyer stated that "It is a beautifully written book, dryly funny and searingly honest about growing up, whether it was discovering feminism, or being slightly out of her depth as a 15-year-old at an Anti-Nazi League rally".

References

2013 non-fiction books
British autobiographies
British memoirs
Music autobiographies
Little, Brown and Company books